Kenny Begins is a 2009 Swedish comedy science fiction film directed by Carl Åstrand and Mats Lindberg. Johan Rheborg stars as Kenny Starfighter, an aspiring galaxy hero who crash lands on Earth. The film is made as a stand-alone prequel to the 1997 television series Kenny Starfighter. It holds the record for most special effects in a Swedish film, displacing the previous recordholder, Frostbite.

Plot
Kenny Starfighter (Johan Rheborg) is probably the most hopeless student that the Hero academics of the galaxy has ever had. His parents Benny (Per Mårtenson) and Jenny (Sissela Kyle) are tired of paying for his studies and give him an ultimatum: graduate or become a hairdresser at the family salon.

In a despondent hunt for graduation points, he crash-lands on Earth by mistake. He meets Pontus (Bill Skarsgård), a limping and bullied 15-year-old with bad eyesight. Pontus has accidentally found a mysterious and luminary power crystal that has given him superpower and the chance to be noticed by the coolest girl in school, Miranda (Carla Abrahamsen).

While Pontus tries to help Kenny escape from becoming a hairdresser, Rutger Oversmart (Jan Mybrand), the most intelligent man in the universe, finds out that the power of the crystal has been absorbed by Pontus. All he just needs to squeeze the power out of Pontus, and then he will become the most powerful man in the universe. When he finds out that a hero from the galaxy is protecting Pontus, he sends one of the most dangerous bounty hunters, Earth, Wind and Fire, to go get him.

Cast
 Johan Rheborg as Kenny Starfighter
 Bill Skarsgård as Pontus
 Carla Abrahamsen as Miranda
 Jan Mybrand as Rutger Oversmart
 Brasse Brännström as General Sudoko
 Björn Gustafsson as Lenny Starfighter
 Cecilia Frode as Thug 1
 Per Svensson as Thug 2
 Josephine Bornebusch as Thug 3
 Pernilla August as Headmaster
 Sissela Kyle as Jenny Starfighter
 Johan Glans as Captain Kaos
 Per Ragnar as Emperor Zing
 Rosie Anderberg as Earth
 Yan Kai Yu as Wind
 Hayes Jemide as Fire

Gallery

See also
 Kenny Starfighter
 List of comedy science fiction films

External links 

 

2009 films
Swedish science fiction comedy films
2000s Swedish-language films
2000s science fiction comedy films
2000s superhero comedy films
2009 comedy films
2000s Swedish films